Harish Poonja ಹರೀಶ್ ಪೂಂಜ  is an Indian politician and member of the legislative assembly from Bharatiya Janata Party representing Belthangady constituency in Dakshina Kannada. Poonja is the part of 15th Karnataka Assembly. Poonja defeated K Vasanth Bangera, a five-time MLA, with a margin of 22,974 votes in 2018.

Son of Agriculturist Shri Muttanna Poonja and Smt Nalini Poonja, Harish Poonja was attracted to RSS ideology as early as 6th year.  He went to Balashaka near his village Padangadi in Belthangady Taluk. He studied in Kannada Medium School in his village. His parents still live in the village with their agricultural occupation.

He is married to Dr Sweekrita Shetty with two kids.

Ex MLA Vasanth Bangera and congress party workers organized a protest outside his office demanding to reveal the accounts for a flood relief fund setup under Harish Poonja's leadership.

A team of local villagers from Dharmasthala, met with Poonja requesting to not issue any permissions for construction of hotels and guest houses in the temple town since it will lead to desecration of the place.

References 

People from Karnataka
People from Mangalore
Bharatiya Janata Party politicians from Karnataka
Karnataka MLAs 2018–2023
Living people
Year of birth missing (living people)